The 2003 NAWIRA Women's Rugby Championship was the inaugural edition of the tournament in the region. The event was hosted by Trinidad and Tobago in Port of Spain, on the 3rd and 4th of December. The competition only featured hosts, Trinidad and Tobago, and Jamaica.

Hosts, Trinidad and Tobago, won the tournament after keeping Jamaica scoreless in both Tests.

Standings

Matches

References 

Women's rugby union competitions for national teams
Rugby union competitions in North America
Rugby union competitions in the Caribbean
Women's rugby union in North America
NACRA